The Central District of Damavand County is in Tehran province, Iran. The district was established in 1938 as Damavand District as part of Tehran County. Its name was automatically changed to the Central District 1946 when it became independent from the county. At the National Census in 2006, its population was 69,829 in 19,643 households. The following census in 2011 counted 71,359 people in 21,158 households. At the latest census in 2016, the district had 84,375 inhabitants in 26,337 households.

References 

Damavand County

Districts of Tehran Province

Populated places in Tehran Province

Populated places in Damavand County

1938 establishments in Iran